Brayan Andrés Torres Quiñones (born 23 January 1998) is a Colombian professional footballer who plays as a left winger.

Club career

FC Botosani
He made his league debut on 16 August 2021 in Liga I match against CS Gaz Metan Medias.

References

External links
 
 Brayan Torres at lpf.ro

1998 births
Living people
Colombian footballers
Association football forwards
Fortaleza C.E.I.F. footballers
Deportivo Pasto footballers
La Equidad footballers
FC Botoșani players
FC Politehnica Iași (2010) players
Categoría Primera A players
Categoría Primera B players
Liga I players
Liga II players
Colombian expatriate footballers
Colombian expatriate sportspeople in Romania
Expatriate footballers in Romania
People from Cundinamarca Department